The 1889 Northwestern Purple football team was an American football team that represented Northwestern University during the 1889 college football season. The team compiled a 2–2 record.  Only one of the five games was an intercollegiate game, a 9–0 loss to Notre Dame on November 14, 1889, in Evanston. The game was the first meeting in the Northwestern–Notre Dame football rivalry.  Northwestern also played games against Evanston High School (18–4 victory), the Chicago University Club (0–28 loss), and the Wanderers Athletic Club (22–0 victory).

Schedule

References

Northwestern
Northwestern Wildcats football seasons
Northwestern Purple football